''Narcissus white streak virus (NWSV) is a plant pathogen of the family Potyviridae which infects plants of the genus Narcissus, and is transmitted by aphids. It is among the commonest and most serious of the viral infections that infect narcissi, but appears to be confined to N. tazetta.

Description 
This virus causes narrow greenish-purple streaks that turn white to yellow, on the leaves and flower stalk after flowering, and premature senescence, which reduces bulb size and yields.

Taxonomy 
Despite its importance, there is relatively little phylogenetic information on NWSV and its taxonomy remains unresolved. It has been proposed as a tentative member of the genus Potyvirus, but never formally accepted.

References

Bibliography 

 
 
 
 
 
 

Viral plant pathogens and diseases
Potyviridae